Heike Faber (born 5 May 1965 in Berlin, Germany) is a German television actress.

External links

Personal Site 

German television actresses
Actresses from Berlin
1965 births
Living people